Hypatima acicula is a moth in the family Gelechiidae. It was described by Kyu-Tek Park and Margarita Gennadievna Ponomarenko in 1999. It is found in Thailand.

The length of the forewings is about 13 mm. The forewings are light orange with a dark brown median costal patch, accompanied by a greyish-orange stripe. There are three to four small, dark brown patches before the apex separated by whitish short streaks. The hindwings are grey.

Etymologly
The species name refers to the needle-like seta on the apices of the juxta lobes in the male genitalia and is derived from Latin acus.

References

Hypatima
Moths described in 1999